Reagan Louie (born 1951, San Francisco, California) is an American photographer and artist whose photography and installations explore cross-cultural identity and global transformation, in Asia and in Asian communities in the United States. His best-known works are Toward a Truer Life: Photographs of China 1980–1990 and Orientalia: Sex in Asia.

Early life and work

As a Chinese American, Louie was raised in two cultures in rural 
Sacramento, California. On his mother's side, he is a fifth generation Californian, which is unusual because the Chinese Exclusion Act barred most Chinese women from entering America. Louie's father was born in a village in Guangdong, China. Louie's early upbringing was within the insular Chinese community. He spoke Cantonese until he entered public school.

Louie has cited this rupture and the process of assimilation as a major influence on his work. In the foreword of his book, Toward a Truer Life, Louie writes about the contradictory nature of his education and assimilation: “…if my education furthered some inner division, it also gave me the means to give voice to it.” He initially studied painting at UCLA, until he began working with Robert Heinecken, who introduced him to photography. He received his MFA at Yale where he studied with Walker Evans.

Early career

His first photography projects during the 1970s, explored changing Asian communities in California; Chinatown, San Francisco, Sacramento Chinese families, and the Japanese truck farms and shops around Sawtelle Boulevard in Los Angeles. In these immigrant communities, Louie recognized manifestations of his own struggle with his conflicted cultural experience. During this period, Louie began working exclusively in color and in a documentary style.

Toward a Truer Life

In 1980, Louie made his first journey to China with no clear agenda. He traveled throughout China, exposing more than 300 rolls of film from which he kept two pictures. Louie states, in the book's forward, that he had to rid himself of all that he knew, clichés, bias, conventions to see China and to understand his cultural heritage. Over the next ten years, Louie made repeated trips to capture his ancestral homeland's dramatic surge toward modernity.

The photographs depict a wide range of subjects from Maoist China's last days to the events of Tiananmen. Louie focused especially on everyday life to show the tumultuous impact of modern China's transformation on its citizens and on its environment. The work also illuminates Louie's odyssey of personal self-discovery.

Peter Hales in his review for the New York Times Book Review writes: “Toward a Truer Life is arguably the best photography book of the year. A decade of deep seeing gave him a collection of grave, perfect color photographs, pictures that far exceed the local circumstances of their making or Mr. Louie’s own quest for a past.”

Other work

In the 1990s Louie worked on two projects. With the support of the Lange/Taylor prize awarded by Duke University he and the writer Tom Farber produced work about the South Pacific. And through the Indivisible project, commissioned by the Center for Creative Photography and the Center for Documentary Studies at Duke University, Louie photographed a community and an arts project in North Philadelphia. During the 2000s, Louie was a contributing photographer for California magazine where he produced several photographic essays, whose subjects ranged from Chinese Americans in California to farm life in the Sacramento delta.

In 1997, Louie returned to Asia on a Fulbright fellowship to study the history of Chinese photography. He was among the several photographers who covered the handover of Hong Kong back to China for The New York Times. He also began a project on sex work in Asia.

Orientalia and controversy

Orientalia was a six-year exploration of the world of Asian sex work. For Louie, "Orientalia" was a continuation of his journey to understand Asia and to evolve an integrated self. "As I began to photograph in Asia, I also discovered that my ethnicity was not the only filter I was perceived through or shaped by. I experienced an unfamiliar dynamic between men and women…" Growing up in America as an Asian male he felt both exoticized and emasculated. But in Asia, with its inherent male dominance, he experienced more traditional gendered roles.

Louie chose to explore these dynamics in the Asian sex industry where the relationships between women and men were visible and dramatically heightened. To represent the diversity of cultures, class, and economics, Louie photographed in China, Taiwan, Hong Kong, Thailand, Burma, Philippines, Vietnam, Cambodia, Japan, South Korea, and Tibet. Above all, Louie sought to represent, without preconceptions, the complexity of sex workers' lives.

Orientalia sparked controversy and debate. For many, the non-judgemental position of the work was problematic. Critic, Glen Helfand in his "Salon" review wrote: “Such images raise lots of difficult questions. Are the women being demeaned or empowered? Are they exoticized or exploited?  The ambivalence is much of what makes these pictures interesting…” But sex activist, Carol Leigh of COYOTE (Call Off Your Old Tired Ethics) observed, "I was very moved by the show. The photographs showed these women as individuals, as people. I liked that there was no explanation and no condemnation."

New work

At the same time he was creating Orientalia, Louie also began a series entitled Asia at the Edge, a study of changes throughout major Asian countries including North Korea. This project also brought him back to China. He saw that the country was a completely different society than in the 1980s, particularly the new millennial generation.

Louie began three projects: Let a Hundred Flowers Blossom depicts the effects of the country’s transformation over three decades through portraits of Chinese citizens. Before and After compares people and places Louie photographed from 30 years to months before, to show the magnitude, speed, and drama of the changes to the country. And in APEC Blue, he juxtaposes major events such as the Beijing Olympics and the Shanghai Expo with quotidian life.

Personal life

Louie is a professor at the San Francisco Art Institute and has taught and lectured widely. In 2014 he taught at The Three Shadows Photography Centre in Beijing and lectured at the China Academy of Art in Hangzhou. He lives and works in the San Francisco Bay Area.

Selected grants, awards, and commissions

Louie has received awards including a John Simon Guggenheim Fellowship, two National Endowment for the Arts Grants, a Fulbright Fellowship, and the Dorothea Lange/Paul Taylor Prize. In 1999, he was the recipient of the Indivisible Commission.

Selected exhibitions

Louie's photographs have been featured in numerous solo and group shows including: the San Francisco Museum of Modern Art, the Southeast Museum of Photography, the Ansel Adams Center, the Chinese Culture Center, the “7th Gwangju Biennale”, “The Darkside”, Fotomuseum Winterthur, "Indivisible", Philadelphia Museum of Art, "China", Hong Kong Art Centre, "Capturing Light" Oakland Museum, "New Photography 4", Museum of Modern Art.

Selected public collections

Louie's works are in museum collections including: the Metropolitan Museum of Art, 
the Museum of Modern Art, the San Francisco Museum of Modern Art, the Los Angeles County Museum of Art.

Selected publications

Louie's publications are listed below in chronological order:

2003      Orientalia: Sex in Asia, Powerhouse, NY. 
1995      Worlds in Collision: Dialogues on Multicultural Art Issues, (co-editor with Carlos Villa), San Francisco Art Institute/International. 
1991      Toward a Truer Life: Photographs of China 1980–1990, Aperture, New York. 

Collections:

2015      Changjiang International Photography and Video Biennale, Catalog, Chongqing, China
2013      Arts for the City, Heyday Press, San Francisco. 
2009      Beyond Beauty, Duke University Press, Durham, NC
2008      Darkside I, Fotomuseum Winterthur/Steidl, Zurich, Switzerland. 
2008      7th Gwangju Biennale Catalogue, Korea
2005      2nd Photo-Triennale Catalogue, Seoul, Korea
2001      Capturing Light: Masterpieces of California Photography, 1850 to the Present, Norton, New York. 
2000     Indivisible, Local Heroes: Changing America, Norton, NY. 
1999     China:  Fifty Years Inside the People’s Republic, Aperture, NY. 
1998     Hope Photographs, Thames and Hudson, NY. 
1987     One Journey to China, Aperture magazine, spring issue 105

References

External links
Radio interview, Forum with Michael Krasney (http://www.kqed.org/a/forum/R30917000), 2003 
Interview, Edgar Barrington (http://www.themodernist.com/terminal1/louie.html), 2003
SexTV Avoiding the Big Talk/Reagan Louie (https://www.imdb.com/title/tt1073022/) (film documentary), 2004
Radio interview, Kojo Nnamdi (https://thekojonnamdishow.org/?s=reagan+louie), 2004
www.moma.org/collection/artists/3606?locale=en
http://www.sfmoma.org/search?query=reagan%20louie&category=art

1951 births
Yale School of Art alumni
San Francisco Art Institute faculty
Photographers from California
Living people
American people of Chinese descent
Artists from Sacramento, California